Government Mohammadpur Model School & College is a public co-educational institution (Class 3 to 12) located in Dhaka, Bangladesh. It has a capacity of 3,960 and over 3,500 students currently studying here.

History

Govt. Mohammadpur Model School & College is a co-educational Bangladeshi educational institution (Grade- III-XII) located at Gaznabi Road near college Gate Bus stand, in the western side of Sher-E- Bangla Agricultural University and Shorawardi Medical College Hospital of Mirpur Road. This institution was established in 2004 by The Ministry of Education of the People's Republic of Bangladesh. It has two buildings each of which is six storied and another two spacious buildings each of which is 7 storied. It has also one computer lab, several respective laboratories for science faculty. It has also two separate and spacious fields for boys and girls. Here esteemed lecturers directly recruited by the Ministry of Education teach the students with great affection and care. The honorable principal, Lt Col Kamal Akbar, afwc, psc, Inf, of this institution is a talented army officer of Bangladesh Army. Co-curricular activities including annual sports, annual cultural program, extempore speech competition, debating, scouting, BNCC etc. are observed with great pomp and show. The school also celebrates the Independence Day, the Victory day and enjoys the Pahela Baishakh. A Baishkhi Mela is also held on the college premise.

Students
The institution offers primary, secondary and higher secondary education for both boys & girls. Admission is based on an entrance test and a viva voce. Usually students may admitted into the institution in third, sixth, ninth or eleventh grade.

Facilities
There are four seven-story buildings, a library, science labs and a computer lab, and separate sports fields for boys and girls. The campus is CCTV-protected; politics and smoking are forbidden.

Extracurricular activities
Government Mohammadpur Model School & College holds annual sports and cultural programs and an extempore speech competition. Clubs include Science, Debate, Language, Scouting and BNCC.

See also
List of colleges in Bangladesh
List of universities in Bangladesh
Education in Bangladesh

References

External links
Official website

Colleges in Dhaka District
High schools in Bangladesh
Educational institutions established in 2004
2004 establishments in Bangladesh